The Caveman, also styled as The Cave Man, is a 1926 silent film comedy produced and distributed by Warner Bros. Lewis Milestone directed the Darryl Zanuck scripted story taken from the play The Cave Man by Gelett Burgess. Matt Moore, Marie Prevost, Hedda Hopper star. A small role is played by a young Myrna Loy, just starting out in her long career. This picture survives in the Library of Congress with a reel missing.

Vitagraph, a predecessor of Warner Brothers, produced a version of this story in 1915 with Robert Edeson.

Cast
Matt Moore as Mike Smagg
Marie Prevost as Myra Gaylord
John Patrick as Brewster Bradford
Myrna Loy as Maid
Phyllis Haver as Dolly Van Dream
Hedda Hopper as Mrs. Van Dream
Virginia Fox as Party girl (uncredited)

References

External links

surviving lobby poster

1926 films
American silent feature films
Films directed by Lewis Milestone
1926 comedy films
Silent American comedy films
American black-and-white films
Warner Bros. films
1920s American films